Tateishia concinna is an ornamental plant in the family Fabaceae. Formerly considered part of the genus Desmodium, recent work (2018) places it into a new genus, Tateishia, along with one other species, Tateishia retusa.

References

Desmodieae